This page lists board and card games, wargames, miniatures games, and tabletop role-playing games published in 2015.  For video games, see 2015 in video gaming.

Games released or invented in 2015
Blood Rage
Codenames
The Contender: The Game of Presidential Debate
Deception
Exploding Kittens
The Gallerist
Karuba
Kingdom Death: Monster
Mombasa
Mysterium
The Ninth Age: Fantasy Battles
The Voyages of Marco Polo
Warhammer Age of Sigmar
XCOM

Game awards given in 2015
 La Granja won the Spiel Portugal Jogo do Ano.

Significant games-related events in 2015
Plaid Hat Games acquired by Canadian board game publishing company F2Z Entertainment.

Deaths

See also
List of game manufacturers
2015 in video gaming

References

Games
Games by year